Kalkadoon is a suburb of Mount Isa in the City of Mount Isa, Queensland, Australia.

Geography 
The Leichhard River flows north-south through the town of Mount Isa, dividing the suburbs of the town into "mineside" (west of the Leichhardt River) and "townside" (east of the Leichhardt River). Kalkadoon is a "mineside" suburb.

Despite the name, the Kalkadoon State High School was in the Mount Isa suburb of Pioneer.

History

References 

City of Mount Isa
Suburbs in Queensland